Derek Cowen (born 20 April 1939) is a former Australian rules footballer who played with North Melbourne in the Victorian Football League (VFL).

A ruckman, Cowen was recruited to North Melbourne from West Coburg. He played 17 of a possible 18 games in 1960 but struggled with injuries over the next few seasons.

In 1963 he joined Irymple for a two year stint as playing coach. Cowen then coached Castlemaine to the 1966 Bendigo Football League premiership. He also won back to back Michelsen Medals while at Castlemaine, which are awarded to the league's best and fairest player, in 1966 and 1967.

References

1939 births
Australian rules footballers from Victoria (Australia)
North Melbourne Football Club players
Castlemaine Football Club players
Living people